The Cardiff Rift is a fictional wormhole in the science fiction television series Doctor Who and its spin-off series Torchwood, one end of which is located in Cardiff Bay, Wales. The other end is apparently floating freely through spacetime, and matter and radiation can pass through the Rift, allowing extraterrestrial and extratemporal artifacts, and occasionally life-forms, to "wash up" in Cardiff. It is described as "Unpredictable and elusive, it’s a gateway for alien creatures, alien weapons, all manner of alien technology and time anomalies to enter our world" and the "flotsam and jetsam of the universe since the dawn of time."

The Rift has been featured in episodes of Doctor Who and is central to the Torchwood, which concerns a branch of the Torchwood Institute created to monitor activity around the Rift. The Rift acts as a plot generator, providing a wide and potentially unlimited array of possible plots for the series, much like the Hellmouth in Buffy the Vampire Slayer and the Bajoran wormhole in Star Trek: Deep Space Nine.

Appearances in the Doctor Who universe

Doctor Who

The Rift first appears in the Doctor Who episode "The Unquiet Dead". This episode takes place in 1869, when the Gelth, gaseous humanoid organisms, pass through the Rift into a funeral parlour, where they are able to "possess" the corpses. It is established that the Rift releases radiation, prolonged exposure to which can grant psychic powers to people, including Gwyneth, a servant in the parlour. The Doctor speaks with the Gelth via Gwyneth in a séance, where they claim to be few in number following the Time War, and ask for the Rift to be widened, allowing the remaining Gelth to live in the corpses. However, after the Doctor discovers that the Gelth are in fact far more populous than first claimed, and intend to slaughter the human race to provide themselves with inhabitable corpses, Gwyneth sacrifices herself by causing a gas explosion, which seals the Rift and apparently kills the Gelth.

The episode "Boom Town", set in modern-day Cardiff, revisits the Rift. The Rift now runs through Roald Dahl Plass, and emits radiation which the TARDIS can harness for use as fuel. However, a member of the Slitheen crime family, Blon Fel-Fotch Pasameer-Day Slitheen, disguised as a woman named Margaret Blaine, becomes the elected Mayor of Cardiff and plans to build a defective nuclear power station on the Rift, which would then cause a nuclear meltdown. The resulting energy shockwave would destroy the planet, but allow Blaine to escape on a tribophysical waveform macro-kinetic extrapolator, described as a "pandimensional surfboard". The Doctor, Rose, Mickey Smith and Jack Harkness manage to foil her plan, but the extrapolator latches onto the TARDIS and causes the Rift to split open, which causes earth tremors across Roald Dahl Plass. The Rift is finally sealed by the TARDIS.

The Tenth Doctor and Martha Jones briefly revisit the Rift in "Utopia" to refuel, treating it as a "pitstop". The Doctor revisits Cardiff to drop off Jack Harkness in "Last of the Time Lords". In "The Stolen Earth", the Torchwood Three team and supercomputer "Mr Smith" use the energy of the Rift to send a signal to the Doctor through the Medusa Cascade. Later, in "Journey's End" the Doctor uses the Rift - after Mr Smith has interfaced with the TARDIS to allow it to lock on properly - as a towrope to literally ”tow" the Earth back to its proper location in time after it was stolen by the Daleks.

Torchwood

The Rift features regularly in Torchwood, with almost every episode involving material or life-forms which have passed through the Rift. The Torchwood Institute website suggests that Torchwood Three was formed in Cardiff as soon as the Torchwood Institute became aware of the Rift's presence. Torchwood Three has also been described as merely a "monitoring station" for the rift.
The website lists among the items found in the Rift "3 new Weevil clusters... [7] items of unknown provenance... 2 weapons... 2 EBEs". However, the Rift appears to be one-way; craft sent through the Rift have been unable to either return or to send back a signal.

In "Out of Time", the Rift facilitates the misplacement of people on board a plane from 1953 to the show's present day. In the episode's conclusion, a temporal immigrant, feeling it will take her home or somewhere new, ventures back into the sky, with her ultimate fate left unclear.

In "Captain Jack Harkness", the Rift is responsible for sending Jack and Tosh back to 1941. In the present day, Owen uses a "Rift machine" designed by Toshiko to open the rift and bring them back (this episode shows the Rift's event horizon properly for this first time).

The consequences of Owen's actions resonate in the next episode, the first series finale "End of Days". By opening the Rift, he has allowed more "flotsam and jetsam" to come through, including a Roman soldier, a group of mediaeval plague sufferers, and even a large UFO. As Jack puts it, opening the Rift has caused the cracks in time to widen on a global scale. The time travelling Bilis Manger shows Gwen a vision of the death of her boyfriend Rhys, convincing her to open the Rift even wider to reverse the damage that has already been done. When this happens, the entity known as Abaddon rises from "beneath the Rift". Jack sacrifices himself to destroy Abaddon, and the Rift immediately closes. The team (including Jack, who has come back from the dead again thanks to his past experiences) still retains the memory of what happened, but some of the actual events have been reverted (such as Rhys returning to life), and Owen spearheads a minor clean-up mission. A year later in "Exit Wounds", Jack's brother Gray has Captain John Hart widen the rift again to unleash chaos across Cardiff, unleashing monsters such as Hoix, Weevils and cowled ghouls from distant times and places. As a Time Agent, Captain John can use his wrist-strap vortex manipulator to travel to Cardiff through the Rift.

In "Adrift", it is revealed that as well as depositing creatures and items in Cardiff, the Rift also takes people, depositing them anywhere in space or time. Gwen discovers that this is the cause of a drastic increase in the amount of missing people in the Cardiff area. The Rift, in an effort to right itself, often returns people again. However, they have often seen such graphic images that they develop mental illnesses.

At the start of Torchwood: Children of Earth (2009), the Hub is destroyed and Torchwood relocate to London as fugitives. Torchwood itself is later destroyed by the end of the serial. Fans were left asking the fate of, among other things, the Rift. The subsequent 2011 series of Torchwood relocates primarily to the United States. When asked in an interview with SFX magazine, Davies stated "I like to think that when [subsequent Doctor Who executive producer] Steven Moffat so thoughtfully closed all those cracks in the universe, the Rift in Cardiff closed up at the same time. I used to wonder what the hell happened to that Rift and now it's all solved. When I watched those cracks seal up I was like, 'Oh, thank you.'" This refers to the events of the 2010 Doctor Who episode "The Big Bang", which was written by Steven Moffat. However, Torchwood media in 2011 since provided a direct explanation for the Rift. In the radio drama "The House of the Dead", Jack visits a haunted location where the Rift allows ghosts, including the deceased Ianto Jones, to enter into the living world. To close the Rift forever and seal an ancient evil on the other side of it, Jack creates a device designed to seal the Rift. The device will also provide Jack an end to his cycle of resurrections. However, Ianto's spirit tricks Jack into leaving, and detonates the device himself, closing the Rift "forever" and with it the barrier between the living and the dead.

Other media
In the Torchwood novel Border Princes by Dan Abnett, it is revealed that several other planets border permanent points where the Rift has anchored. One such planet has a similar organization to Torchwood entitled The First Senior, whose title for the Rift translates as The Stumble, The Misstep or The Border. When The First Senior heard of Torchwood, they inserted a Principal, a spy who could observe how they handle the Rift, purely for research into how other "Rift guardians" operate. Like all Doctor Who and Torchwood spin-off media, its place in canon is unclear.

Attributes and effects
The Rift has facilitated an underground Weevil infestation and allows for alien technology to wash up in Cardiff, which are sometimes acquired by Torchwood Three. Creatures have been known to pass presumably through time because of the Rift, including a pterodactyl. It can be used as a source of power for the TARDIS, perhaps replacing the Eye of Harmony. The landing of the TARDIS near the fountain in Roald Dahl Plass resulted in the ship's "perception properties" being welded to the Rift, creating a "perception filter" that prevents anyone outside that spot from noticing anything inside. In 19th-century Cardiff, Gwyneth developed telepathic powers as a result of lifelong exposure to the Rift. "Out of Time" suggests that the Rift can act as an unpredictable window through time in certain weather conditions. Much as the Rift deposits all things alien in Cardiff, it also takes; as a result of this Cardiff has an unusually high missing persons rate owing to humans scattered throughout space and time by the Rift. The destruction of a hospital in Cardiff caused the psychic energy of all the lives spent and lost there, in conjunction with the Rift, to cause 1918 and 2008 to begin to overlap in "To the Last Man".

In April 1913, "preshocks" of the Rift's opening in "End of Days" manifested as ground tremors. Before the dawn of time, as with the Beast, Biblical demon Abaddon had been sealed away in Earth, using the Rift as a means for his imprisonment. This suggests that it happened "before the universe's creation" as with the Beast, and that the Beast's captors, the "Disciples of Light" may have had a hand in the formation of the Rift as they did with the gravity field in "The Impossible Planet". The Rift is not dependent on Abaddon, however; in fact, Jack warns that it will be more violent than ever following his release.

Similar anomalies
In "Boom Town", the Ninth Doctor refers to the Rift in the plural, indicating that there are others elsewhere. In series 3 episode "The Sound of Drums" (2007), the Master (John Simm) also refers to the Doctor sealing the rift at the heart of the Medusa Cascade, deep in space. The Daleks later planned to make use of this rift in spreading their Reality Bomb ("Journey's End", 2008). When explaining the prevalence of foresight abilities in Pompeii, the Doctor explains Mount Vesuvius temporarily opened a Rift in time and space, which accounts for this, in the episode "The Fires of Pompeii" (2008). In the series 6 episode "The Doctor's Wife" (2011), the Eleventh Doctor (Matt Smith) travels through a time rift to a location "outside" the universe. He comments that his TARDIS should refuel by virtue of being exposed, as with the Cardiff rift, to temporal energies.

Similar phenomena are encountered in other stories. For example, in Image of the Fendahl (1977), the Fourth Doctor (Tom Baker) encounters a "time fissure" in Fetch Borough in the West Country of England.  Another "time fissure" located in the village of Foxgrove, Hertfordshire appears in The Temptation of Sarah Jane Smith (2008), a The Sarah Jane Adventures serial in which Sarah Jane Smith (Elisabeth Sladen) returns a time-displaced boy from 1951 through this fissure, and is tempted to use it meet her parents who died in her infancy. A "scar in time and space" in San Francisco featured in the 1999 Eighth Doctor novel Unnatural History by Jonathan Blum and Kate Orman. It was also created by the TARDIS malfunctioning (this time as seen at the end of the eighth Doctor's only television adventure) and also had the consequence of creating a hole in time which was a magnet to strange phenomena, including timeslips and creatures which appeared magical.

In the Torchwood comic story "Shrouded" by Gareth David-Lloyd, John Hart reveals that he moved to Mexico to buy and sell alien artefacts because a "small rift" is located near the Gulf, which he uses as his "tube to work".

Reception
The Rift plot device has attracted some critical commentary. In Under Torch Wood, a one-off Torchwood parody for The Register (a dialogue in the style of Welsh poet Dylan Thomas' radio play Under Milk Wood), columnist Verity Stob derides the device as lazy writing on the part of Davies and his writing team, and comments on its large indebtedness to the Hellmouth from Buffy the Vampire Slayer. Gwen asks "What is the Rift?"; the narrative voice describes it as "a kind of hellmouth that is sucking on a transcendental, transdimensional gobstopper. It is a double-egg MacGuffin served with large fries.

See also
Anomaly (Primeval)
Bajoran wormhole (Star Trek)
Boom tube
Portkey
Stargate (Stargate)
Time portal

References

External links
More information on the Rift

Cardiff in fiction
Doctor Who locations
Torchwood
Fiction about wormholes